Michael DeWayne Tait (born May 18, 1966) is an American contemporary Christian music artist. Michael Tait met Toby McKeehan in 1984 when he was in high school. Both Toby and Michael met Kevin Max while attending Liberty University in the late 1980s, and together they formed four-time Grammy winning band DC Talk, with whom Michael Tait has released five acclaimed studio albums. Tait is the current lead singer of Newsboys, and one third of Christian rock group DC Talk (though the group has been on hiatus since 2000). Tait also has had success in his solo career, founding a band called Tait in 1997. He toured as a solo act until 2007. He became lead singer of the Christian pop rock band Newsboys in 2009. Aside from singing, Tait is also a self-taught guitar player. Tait also has a sister Lynda Randle, who is a Southern Gospel singer.

Musical career

DC Talk (1988–2001)
Michael Tait met Toby McKeehan in 1984 while he was in high school in the Washington, D.C. area, and together they began creating music. Michael Tait and Toby McKeehan both met Kevin Max while attending Liberty University in the mid-1980s. Together, all three formed the four-time Grammy winning band DC Talk and released 5 acclaimed studio albums. In 2000, the band announced a hiatus with the release of Intermission: the Greatest Hits while all three members devoted themselves to solo projects. The band has not toured together since 2001 (except for one time in Redmond, Washington in 2005 and when TobyMac made a surprise guest appearance at Winter Jam in 2010 in Nashville and sang "Jesus Freak" with Tait). The three have recorded four songs together since the announcement of the hiatus including the remix of "Atmosphere" on TobyMac's 2004 album Welcome to Diverse City, a cover of the Prince song "The Cross" on Kevin Max's 2007 album The Blood, "Love Feels Like" on TobyMac's 2015 album This Is Not a Test and "Let's Roll" following the September 11, 2001 attacks.

Tait (1997–2007)
After DC Talk's hiatus was announced, Tait dedicated more time to his band Tait (which he named after his father, Nathel). Tait had partially formed this band around 1997. One of the original members was guitarist Pete Stewart (from the hard rock band Grammatrain), who is featured on the first album, but absent from the second one due to his departing the band to work on his own solo projects. In 2006, Tait announced that they were working on an album titled Loveology. Though Michael is now touring as frontman for the Newsboys, he still has plans to release Loveology. In an interview with John Dibiase of Jesusfreakhideout.com, he stated that Loveology is still in the works, and will be a separate project from the Newsboys. In the interview Michael said, "Loveology is going to become something we're going to be writing about very soon. I can't tell you now, but it's a project with the boys and I and Ben Moody, which is another whole music project."

Newsboys (2009–present)

An official statement was released on March 9, 2009 that announced Michael Tait as the new lead singer of Newsboys. Coincidentally, Tait's former group, DC Talk toured with Newsboys in the 1990s. On March 7, 2009, Tait surprised the crowd by performing as Newsboys' lead singer for the first time and announcing that he would be the band's new lead singer. In the official statement released on March 9, Tait said, "For years dc Talk and Newsboys have been family and thus shared the same fans. When I received the initial call from Newsboys to consider joining the band as lead singer, I was speechless! I immediately sought wise counsel and flooded the heavens with endless prayers for insight and vision, and I soon received a clear and definite peace. Last weekend, I had the opportunity to perform my first show as Newsboys' front man to an audience of 12,000 people. I was completely wrapped in love and support by Newsboys' fans, who are clearly the best fans on the planet. Now I know this is exactly where I belong in this new and wonderful moment in my life's history. This is a definite highlight of my career and for my 20+ years of walking with Jesus, and I am humbled, proud and privileged to call myself a Newsboy."

Former Newsboys lead singer Peter Furler still provided lead vocals on the 2009 album In the Hands of God, though Michael Tait provided supporting vocals, along with Jamie Rowe of Guardian. Furler's last performance as lead vocalist took place during a performance at Disney's Night of Joy 2009. Michael performed lead vocals for most of the songs, but Peter did come out to sing lead on the song "Breakfast".

In 2010, the reborn Newsboys announced information about their 15th studio album (and first with Tait on lead vocals), Born Again, which was released on July 13. That was followed by Christmas! A Newsboys Holiday, including a previously recorded Tait song. In 2011, God's Not Dead, and the live follow-up, Newsboys Live in Concert: God's Not Dead in 2012, Restart in 2013, and Hallelujah for the Cross in 2014.

After the release of Love Riot, and United, the Newsboys released Stand on October 1, 2021. The band released a special version of the title track "Stand" with Toby Mac as a guest.

Other projects
Tait has also starred as Hero in !Hero. He also contributed to various books, including the popular Jesus Freaks and Jesus Freaks II books. He has also contributed to the books Under God and Living Under God with DC Talk bandmate TobyMac.

Discography

with Tait
 Empty (2001)
 Lose This Life (2003)

with Newsboys

Studio albums
 Born Again (2010)
 God's Not Dead (2011)
 Restart (2013)
 Hallelujah for the Cross (2014)
 Love Riot (2016)
 United (2019)
 Stand (2021)

EPs
 Christmas! A Newsboys Holiday (2010)

Live albums
 Live in Concert: God's Not Dead (2012)

Singles

Guest appearances
 Carman - Addicted to Jesus - "Addicted to Jesus" (1992)
 Reality Check - Reality Check - "Apart from You" (1997)
 Rich Mullins - The Canticle of the Plains (1997)
 Pete Stewart - Pete Stewart - "Uphill Battle" (1999)
 Point of Grace - A Christmas Story - "Light of the World" (1999)
 Roaring Lambs - "Salt and Light" (with Ashley Cleveland) (2000)
 Jaci Velasquez - Crystal Clear - "Center of Your Love" (2000)
 Jennifer Knapp - The Way I Am - "Say Won't You Say" (2001)
 City on a Hill: It's Christmas Time - "It's Christmas Time", "O Holy Night" (2002)
 Newsboys - "The Fad of the Land" - Thrive (2002)
 Third Day - Offerings II: All I Have to Give - "God of Wonders [live]" (2003)
 TobyMac - Welcome to Diverse City - "Atmosphere (remix featuring DC Talk)" (as DC Talk) (2004)
 In the Name of Love: Artists United for Africa - "One" (U2 cover) (2004)
 DJ Maj - Boogiroot - "H.A.N.D.S." (2005)
 Building 429 - Rise - "Empty" (2006)
 Kevin Max - The Blood - "The Cross" (as DC Talk) (2007)
 Marc Scibilia - Fixity - "Worship Song" (2007)
 T-Bone - Bone-Appetit! - "Raised in Harlem" (2007). Previously released on !Hero (2003)
 Newsboys - In the Hands of God (2009)
 "Come Together Now (Music City Unites for Haiti)" (charity single, relief effort led by Michael W. Smith) (2010)
 JakeACE - Get Down Everybody - "Wings Like Eagles" (2010)
 Music Inspired by The Story - "Bring Us Home (Joshua)" with Blanca Callahan from Group 1 Crew and Lecrae (EMI Christian Music 2011)
 Karyn Williams - Only You - "Hey There" (2013)
 TobyMac;– This Is Not a Test - "Love Feels Like (featuring DC Talk)" (as DC Talk) (2015)
 TobyMac;– Hits Deep Live - "Love Feels Like [live]" (featuring DC Talk)" (as DC Talk) (2016)
TobyMac -  life after death-space( ft Kevin max and Michael Tait)as dc talk 2022

Music videos

With DC Talk
"Heavenbound" (1989)
"I Luv Rap Music" (1991)
"Nu Thang" (1991)
"Walls" (1992)
"Jesus Is Just Alright" (1993)
"The Hardway" (1994)
"Luv Is a Verb" (1994)
"Jesus Freak" (1995)
"Between You and Me" (1996)
"Colored People" (1997)
"Day by Day" (1997)
"My Friend, So Long" (1998)
"Consume Me" (1999)

With Tait
"Altars" (2001)
"Lose This Life" (2003)

With Newsboys
"Born Again" (2010)
"Miracles" (2011)
"God's Not Dead (Like a Lion)" (2012)
"Live With Abandon" (2013)
"That's How You Change The World" (2014)
"We Believe" (2014)
"Guilty"  [from the film God's Not Dead 2] (2015)
"Crazy" (2016)
"Hero" (2016)
"Guilty" (2016)

Video guest appearances
"Addicted to Jesus" by Carman (1992)
"AKA Public School" by Audio Adrenaline (1993)
"I Can Only Imagine" by MercyMe (2001)
"Thrive: Live from the Rock & Roll Hall of Fame" by Newsboys (2002)
"Mountaintop" by The City Harmonic (2013)

Personal life

Tait has five sisters, one of them is Southern gospel alto singer Lynda Randle.

Tait told Fox News Radio host Todd Starnes in February 2016 that he supported Ted Cruz for president in the 2016 election. Tait signed a letter opposing President Donald Trump's impeachment in December 2019 and also participated in the Evangelicals for Trump rally in January 2020.

In 2021, he appeared on Candace, a political commentary show hosted by conservative activist Candace Owens.

References

External links 
 
 
 

1966 births
Living people
21st-century Christians
African-American Christians
American performers of Christian music
Performers of contemporary Christian music
DC Talk members
Liberty University alumni
Newsboys members
21st-century African-American male singers
20th-century African-American male singers